Transform is the second single album by the South Korean boy band Teen Top. It was released on January 11, 2011 with the song "Supa Luv" as the title track. A remix version of the song was released on February 18, 2011.

History
The K-pop world has been buzzing over the group's hot new looks, including their eye-catching, silver-haired cyborg concept. This time Teen Top's album photography is done by renowned photographer Hong Jang Hyun, who previously worked with Big Bang, 2NE1, and Lee Hyo Ri. It also helps to have Shinhwa's Eric around to feature in the teaser for the title song Supa Luv, a stylish dance pop number produced by Shin Hyuk (the producer of Justin Bieber's One Less Lonely Girl).

Track listing

Charts

Album chart

Single chart

Sales and certifications

References

External links
 Official Website

2011 albums
Single albums
Teen Top albums